Lewisville Park is a 154-acre regional park located on the East Fork Lewis River, two miles north of Battle Ground in Clark County, Washington.  It was listed on the National Register of Historic Places in 1986.

History
The park was built starting in 1936 as a Works Progress Administration (WPA) recreational center project.  The architecture and overall design of the park is intentionally rustic, a common idiom promoted by federal land management agencies in the early part of the 20th century. Lewisville park is the oldest in the county park system and is one of the most significant and lasting examples of the WPA in Clark County.

Several of the existing structures were built by WPA workers between 1936 and 1940 and were still existing when the park was added to the national register, including a caretaker's cottage, bathhouse, kitchen, one large and two small shelters.  All were built to appear non-intrusive and used local logs and rocks in their construction.  Several other buildings, not a part of the historic register list, were built in the 1950s and 1960s and maintained the natural aesthetic designs of the existing structures.

Present day
Facilities include: A Swimming hole (no lifeguard on duty), nature trails, playgrounds, a tennis/basketball court and sports fields, fishing, and other facilities typical of large regional asset parks.

See also
 National Register of Historic Places listings in Clark County, Washington

References

External links

 Official website

1936 establishments in Washington (state)
Historic districts on the National Register of Historic Places in Washington (state)
National Register of Historic Places in Clark County, Washington
Parks in Clark County, Washington
Parks on the National Register of Historic Places in Washington (state)